High is the sixth album by American thrash metal band Flotsam and Jetsam, released on June 3, 1997. It was their first release on Metal Blade Records since 1986's Doomsday for the Deceiver, whereas their previous three albums were released on MCA.

High marked the first time the band had kept their lineup intact for more than two albums, although, until 2012's Ugly Noise, it was their last album with guitarist Michael Gilbert and drummer Kelly David Smith.

Similar to Flotsam and Jetsam's previous three albums, the lyricial content of High is centered around politics and society, and expands on the band's sense of humor documented from its predecessor Drift.

Track listing

Credits
Kelly David-Smith – drums
Edward Carlson – guitars
Eric A.K. – vocals
Jason Ward – bass
Michael Gilbert – guitars

References

1997 albums
Flotsam and Jetsam (band) albums